Lucia Witbooi (born 1961 in Gabes, ǁKaras Region) is a Namibian politician. A member of SWAPO, Witbooi was elected to the Namibia's National Assembly in the 2009 general election. Prior to entering the National Assembly, Witbooi was a teacher in Gibeon, Hardap Region. She studied at Suiderlig High School in Keetmanshoop and worked in the administration of the Namaland bantustan.

Occupation 
She is a politician and a educator.

Education 
Lucia Witbooi has a Higher Diploma in Education from the University of Port Elizabeth in 1999; Diploma in Education from Azaliah College for Further and Higher Education in 1997 and obtained a Higher Primary Education Certificate at University of Namibia [UNAM] in 1996 as well as a Grade 12 Certificate at Suiderling Senior Secondary School, Keetmashoop 1979.

Career 
Head of Department at Dr. W.M Jod Primary School 2009; a teacher for 27 years; Gibeon Schools cluster convenor for counseling from 2003 until 2009 and  A.M.E church- W.M.S Executive board member – local, Area and annual level.

References

1961 births
Living people
People from ǁKaras Region
Nama people
SWAPO politicians
Members of the National Assembly (Namibia)
Namibian educators
21st-century Namibian women politicians
21st-century Namibian politicians
Women members of the National Assembly (Namibia)